Drepanulatrix falcataria is a species of geometrid moth in the family Geometridae. It is found in North America.

The MONA or Hodges number for Drepanulatrix falcataria is 6689.

Description 
Drepanulatrix falcataria has a dusty brown pattern on its wings. The pattern includes small black dots and varying shades of brown and tan.

References

Further reading

 

Caberini
Articles created by Qbugbot
Moths described in 1873